St. Thomas Aquinas Catholic School  is a mixed Catholic secondary school in Kings Norton, Birmingham, England.

The school, which is part of the Birmingham Catholic Partnership, consists of key stage three (Yr 7 and 8), key stage four (years 9 to 11) and a sixth form. The sixth form provision is offered as part of Oaks Sixth Form College, a consortium of 7 secondary schools in South-West Birmingham.

The school has a library, known as the Aquinas Resource Centre or the "ARC".<ref>Aquinas Resource Centre, St. Thomas Aquinas Catholic School, accessed 13 November 2009</ref> Facilities also include a large playground, a large sports hall, a gym, and a music technology suite.

Notable former pupils
Ayo Akinwolere, co-presenter of Blue PeterIan Ashbee, Hull City midfielder
Darren Bradley, West Bromwich Albion captain
Josh Cooke, Swindon Town forward
Aidan Davis, Britain's Got Talent finalist and presenter of CBBC's Friday Download''
Martin Duffy, Primal Scream musician
Gavin Mahon, Queens Park Rangers midfielder
Dan Preston, AFC Telford United defender

References

Secondary schools in Birmingham, West Midlands
Catholic secondary schools in the Archdiocese of Birmingham
Academies in Birmingham, West Midlands